Mymensingh is the capital of Mymensingh Division, Bangladesh. The city was constituted by the British East India Company on 1 May 1787.

Mymensingh is the 8th administrative divisional headquarter and 12th city corporation of Bangladesh. According to Ministry of Public Administration, Mymensingh is ranked 4th in district status. The population density of Mymensingh city is 44,458/km2 (115,150/sq mi), making it the second most densely populated city in Bangladesh. Mymensingh attracts 25 percent of all the health tourists visiting Bangladesh. Mymensingh is an anglicisation of the name Momen Singh, referring to a Muslim ruler called Shah Momin or Momin Singh, an ethnic Bengali Muslim ruler. Its elevation is over 19 m above sea level, the highest of Bangladesh's major cities. Mymensingh is close to Tura, a city in Meghalaya from the Gobrakura Land Port.

Mymensingh is associated with the Brahmaputra river, handcrafted duvets called Nakshikantha, and a rural ballad called Maimansingha Gitika. The cadet college established in Tangail in 1963 was called Momenshahi Cadet College. The city is known for educational institutions.

History 

Mymensingh is one of the sixteen old districts of Bangladesh which was constituted by the British East India Company on 1 May 1787. Being more than 220 years old, Mymensingh has a rich cultural and political history.  In the beginning, Begunbari was chosen as the headquarters of the district. However, the district headquarters was relocated to Mymensingh when Begunbari devastated by a flash flood. Earlier Mymensingh was called Nasirabad, after Nasiruddin Nasrat Shah. During the British Raj most of the inhabitants of the town were Hindus. During the British, this district was ruled by Banik Zamindars who moved to India during Partition.

From the early 20th century Muslims moved into town. Since then this city has played an important role as a centre for secularism. The Vidyamoyee Uccha Balika Bidyalaya and Muminunnesa Women's College have played a great role in educating Bengali Muslim women. A majority of first-generation successful Bangladeshi women have attended these schools and colleges, including the first woman justice of the High Court of Bangladesh, Justice Nazmun Ara Sultana. However, many Hindu families left Bangladesh during the partition of India in 1947. A second spell of Exodus took place following the Indo-Pak war of 1965.  Many people born and raised Mymensingh have left for West Bengal since the 1960s. The exodus continues albeit at a slower pace. On 1 December 1969, Tangail subdivision was separated from Mymensingh and a new District of Tangail was formed. Then in 1977 another new district Jamalpur (including Sherpur) was formed.

The nine-month liberation war of Bangladesh started on 27 March 1971.  Mymensingh remained free from the occupation army until 23 April 1971. Pakistani occupation forces deserted Mymensingh on 10 December, and Mukti Bahini took over on 11 December, just five days ahead of the victory of Dhaka on 16 December.

Geography and climate

The city has no officially defined geographical limits. Since the 1980s the city has expanded with fast urbanisation. Mymensingh city is clearly marked by the old Brahmaputra River flowing along its north. Shambhuganj is situated on the other side of the Brahmaputra, connected by the Shambhuganj Bridge. Other ends of the city are marked respectively by the beginning of the Agricultural University campus, the Medical College, Army cantonment and, finally, Sultanabad, a township built for the followers of Aga Khan. A railway line connecting Dhaka with northern districts, built between 1885 and 1899, passes through the city and divides it into two sides.

The climate of Mymensingh is a little cooler than Dhaka, as it is closer to the Himalayas, and sufficient to be a monsoon-influenced humid subtropical climate (Köppen Cwa) instead of a tropical savanna or tropical monsoon climate as found further south in Bangladesh. The monsoon starts in May or June and continues till August. It rains heavily and sometimes for days and weeks. The temperature falls below  in winter which is spread over December and January and may well include November and February. High humidity causes heavy sweating during this period. For western travelers, the best time to visit is between November and February.

Administration

Mymensingh is the headquarter of one of the eight administrative divisions of Bangladesh. Divisional Commissioner, who is the administrative chief of Mymensingh Division, DIG for Mymensingh division and other divisional civil servants have their own offices in the city, which functions as part of the government administrative setup. Deputy Commissioner (DC) who is the administrative chief of Mymensingh District, Civil Surgeon and other district level civil servants have their offices in the city.

One mayor and ward commissioners are elected for five-year terms by direct votes. Mymensingh City Corporation is responsible for all the administrative work related to city governance.

Economy 

Historically, Mymensingh district was known for jute production which was termed 'golden fibre' due to revenue it generated as a cash crop.  Due to the high demand for polythene bags and other economic reasons, the jute industry has significantly declined. As Mymensingh is the capital of Mymensingh Division, government employees make up a large percentage of the city's workforce. Mymensingh also has a large unskilled and semi-skilled labour population, who primarily earn their livelihood as hawkers, Rickshaw pullers, taxi drivers, mechanics and other such professions. Agriculture is the most important sector contributing to GDP, followed by the growing service sector in the city. The increasing demand for fish in the local and global markets has generated a new opportunity for local fishermen as well as businessmen to exploit fishing in Mymensingh, and today it is very important to the economy. People have changed their paddy fields to ponds and are cultivating fish. Prawns, sometimes reaching a very large size in the winter, are sold in Mymensingh in great numbers.

The entire area between Durgabari Road, and Maharaja Road comprises the traditional shopping area. There are places like Ganginarpar, Boro Bazaar, Choto Bazaar, Mechua Bazaar within this area. There are spots like Jilapi Patty which is for making and selling jilapi. The main road from Notunbazar to the railway station & C.K. Ghosh Road to Charpara hosts a number of shops for manufactured products and clothing.

Public utilities

City centre
The city center of Mymensingh is along the Ganginarpar Road, which is known as the vein or life line of Mymensingh city. Some more busy area of the city are Chorpara Moor, Town Hall Moor, Zero Point Moor & Bridge Moor.

Cuisine

The staple food is plain rice with a curry of fish or meat. Normally people start with fried or steamed vegetable and dal, a kind of lentil soup.  Often people squeeze a citron slice or take additional salt while eating and add fresh shallots and green pepper as seasoning. Traditional snacks and savouries include seasonal pitha of various kinds, dal-puri, and shingara. Home made desserts include Khyr, Payesh and Shemai. Sweets soaked in syrup of sugar, such as Jilapi, are mostly bought from shops. Pan, a digestive made out of betel nuts, spices, tobacco, and certain other ingredients are eaten by many people, some of which consume it with aromatic Dzorda. For dinner or lunch, a simple formula is to prepare "khichuri", the broth of rice and lentils, seasoned with spices, and served with chutney or pickles. Ghee (butter) may be spread just before eating. The meal may end with sweet curd. Muri (puffed rice), chira (flattened rice) and khoi (popped rice) are substitutes for rice. They are eaten with gur (jaggery) which is a kind of unrefined sugar. They may be mixed with yogurt or milk before eaten. People use only the right hand for eating.

Religion

Mosques, temples, and churches

Mymensingh is one of the cities in Bangladesh where Muslims, Christians and Hindus band together. All types of festivals of these religions as well as others like Pahela Boishakh are celebrated throughout the city. The greatest ones are the Eids. During the Durga Puja the whole city is decorated with lights, gates and flowers. Many tourists visit the city at this time. Some Christian families also live in Mymensingh mainly at the place called "Vati-Kashore".

Anjuman Eid-gah Maidan
Every year congregation of Eid ul-Fitr and Eid ul-Adha are held here in the morning. The prayer ground is walled on sides with coconut trees growing. This place was used to accommodate the Elephants of Maharaj Surya Kanta Acharya in colonial time.

Durga Bari Temple
Durga Bari Temple is one of the main religious centers for the Hindus living in Mymensingh. It is situated in the Durga Bari Road. Hindu Goddess Durga Devi is worshiped here. Kirtan is recited in the temple throughout the week.

Ramakrishna Math and Mission
Ramakrishna Ashrama of Mymensingh is situated at 182, Ramakrishna Mission Road. Ramakrishna Math is a monastic organisation for men brought into existence by Sri Ramakrishna.

St Patrick's Cathedral Church
The Roman Catholic Diocese of Mymensingh is a diocese located in the city of Mymensingh in the Ecclesiastical province of Dhaka in Bangladesh. Bishop Ponen Paul Kubi, CSC, DD is head of the Diocese of Mymensingh. Most of the people in this diocese are from Garo tribal community. Bishop is also a Garo tribal. A total of 76,047 Catholics and 6665 Protestant Christians live here. People are employed as farmers and day laborers in rural areas, and many people live in cities as migrant workers.

Mymensingh Baptist Church
The Mymensingh Baptist Church is located near to the town hall.

St. Andrew Bessette Catholic Church, Diglakona Mymensingh catholic Diocese
inauguration and Blessing Ceremony of St. Andre Bessette Church took place at Diglakona Parish under Mymensingh Catholic Diocese on February 10, 2022. We express our sincere thanks and gratitude to  Ms. Carol Andrejasich, Holy Cross Mission Centre, USA, and other Donors.

BCSM is a Movement of Catholic students in Bangladesh
We are Mymensingh Unit try to provide different information regarding BCSM & Mymenisingh Youth Commission.

Landmarks
The Old Town Hall, built by Maharaja Surya Kanta Acharyya had hosted thousands of drama, meeting and cultural functions since 1878. The age old Town Hall was demolished in 2006 and is being rebuilt by the Mymensingh Pourashava.

Bangladesh Parishad, situated at Chhoto Bazar Road, the regional centre of Pakistan Council in Mymensingh, set up in 1969, came to be known as Bangladesh Parishad after establishment of Bangladesh in 1971. It was a government institution under the Ministry of Information and housed a public library with a collection of books and magazines. The library has 35,656 volumes on all subjects. It also had a hall to hold literary and cultural functions. Till the 1980s, Bangladesh Parishad was a hub of cultural activity of post-liberation Mymensingh. It was most active in the late 1970s when Ashraf Ali Khan was its chief executive.

Shishu Academy was set up under the initiative of president Ziaur Rahman in 1980. Its Mymensingh office was opened in the 1990s.

The first Shahid Minar was built in 1958 on crossing of the Amrita Babu Road, close Mymensingh Pourashava. It was relocated to the Town Hall premises around the mid-1990s.

Amarabati Natya Mandir was the first theatre built in the heart of Mymensingh town in the 1930s. Later it was converted into a cinema named Chayabani. The Town Hall became the sole venue for staging a play or drama. Bahubrihi is one of the drama circles that has played a key role in sustaining the drama movement in Mymensingh since the 1970s. Singing was part of daily life for most people since the 19th century. Mithun Dey and Sunil Dhar were two local music teachers since the 1960s. Sunil Dhar established a music school at Atharo Bari Building in the 1980s. Folk Ballads: Maimansingha Gitika. There are three cinema halls in Mymensingh town. Most of these halls are very old but still in operation. Cable TV connectivity was launched in 1999 and together with DVD and VCR, most people now prefer home entertainment With Dish Cable Line. However, on special occasions such as Eid, new year, Puja, and other vacations, people still watch movies in the cinema halls. Aloka was the oldest cinema hall, which was demolished in 2006 to make a modern shopping and residential complex. Other cinema halls are Chayabani, Purabi and Shena-Auditorium.

Muslim Institute library is a public library which was established in 1934. The Bangladesh Parishad library has died down since the 1980s. The local Bar also has a library of its own rich in legal books and journals.

The "Alexandar Castle" or "Lohar Kutir" as it is locally known, is where Maharaja Surya Kanta Acharya invited Grand Duke Boris of Russia and General Sir George White, and built it for his stay and a same Russian styled also built by the Ponni of Tangail. Rabindranath Tagore also was in Alexandra castle for participating a citizen gathering. This earthquake-proof steel and timber building was built after his much vaunted "Crystal Palace" or "Rang Mahal" as it was locally known, was destroyed by the Great Bengal Earthquake of 12 June 1897. Subsequently, "Soshi Lodge" or "Mymensingh Palace" was built at the site of "Rang Mahal". However Maharaja Surya Kanta died before "Soshi Lodge" could be completed. It was completed by Maharaja Soshi Kanta Acharyya. Both the buildings had once contained innumerable works of art, artefacts, sculptures and antiques collected from all over the world. Both these buildings have been declared as National Heritage Monuments. But unplanned development already damaged the scenario of rare Russian architecture in this country.

Bipin Park is a small park near Boro Bazaar right on the Brahmaputra River.

Museums
The Mymensingh Museum was established in 1969.Though its collection comes from the palaces of zamindars of the greater Mymensingh region, it lacks proper preservation.

The Zainul Abedin Museum was established in a house on the Brahmaputra River in 1975. The art gallery includes the paintings of Zainul Abedin, a pioneer of the country's modern art movement, as well as an art school, art cottage, and open-air stage.

The Fish Museum & Biodiversity Center, also known as FMBC, is operated by Bangladesh Agricultural University.

Sports
The "Panditparar Math" is a vast field on the bank of the Brahmaputra, in front of the Circuit House, which is used by the sports persons of the city. It has produced many notable cricket players like Prabir Kumar Sen, one of the few wicket keepers to stump Don Bradman and Hemanga Bose. The former vice captain of Bangladesh national cricket team, Mahmudullah was born in this district and he served Bangladesh cricket team proudly.

Body building has become a favourite pastime for many of the young adults of the town. The Muslim Institute has a well equipped gymnasium since the 1950s. Physician Abdul Halim was a renowned bodybuilder in the 1960s who became Mr. East Pakistan in a nationwide competition. Farhad Ahmed Kanchon,who later became a Member of the Parliament in the late 1970s, was also a regular.

Education 

Many students come from other districts for education. The city contains a number of universities, colleges and schools, including:
 Notre Dame College, Mymensingh
 Bangladesh Agricultural University
 Jatiya Kabi Kazi Nazrul Islam University
 Mymensingh Medical College
 Mymensingh Engineering College
 Mymensingh Girls' Cadet College
 Ananda Mohan College
 Muminunnesa Women's College
 Shahid Syed Nazrul Islam College
 Mymensingh Polytechnic Institute
 Agricultural University College, Mymensingh
 Women Teachers Training College
 Royal Media College
 Mymensingh Zilla School
 Vidyamoyee Sarkari Balika Uccha Bidyalaya
 Govt. Laboratory High School, Mymensingh
 Mukul Niketon High School
 Cantonment Public School and College, Mymensingh
 Mymensingh Govt. College
 Muslim Girls High School And College, Mymensingh

Transportation 

The city was linked with Dhaka after the railway lines were connected around 1865. The road link to Dhaka was via Tangail until the president ordered the completion of the half-finished N3 national highway between Dhaka and Mymensingh via Bhaluka. In 2012, the bus fare in the city was around TK.100–220 (US$1.45–$2.75) per person. However, rickshaw and "Auto" is the main mode of transportation within the city area, and the growth of the number of cars is highly progressive. Three-wheelers started to ply toward the end of the 1990s.

Train is by far the cheapest means to get to Mymensingh: Narayanganj-Bahadurabad Ghat Line. Apart from a number of local and direct trains, Ekota Express, Aghnibina Express, Tista Express, Brahmaputra Express, Jamuna Express and Balaka Express connect the town with the capital of Dhaka. Train fares range from 55 tk to 483 tk ($0.68 to $4) per person depending upon the class and the train itself. There are 7 Seat Categories. Shuvon 120 tk, Shuvon Chair 140 tk, First class Seat 185 tk, First class Birth 280 tk , Snigdha 271 tk, AC seat 322 tk, Ac Birth 483 tk. It takes almost or over 3 hours to reach Mymensingh from Dhaka by train. There are 3 main stopages station: Dhaka Airport railway station, Joydebpur and Gafargaon Upazila. All inter-city trains connect the city with Jamalpur town as well. Several local trains run between Mymensingh town to Kishoreganj and Netrokona.From 2012 a special train started from Mymensingh to "Bongobondhu Jamuna Shetu" named "Dholesshori Express". Prime Minister Sheikh Hasina was present there at the starting day of the new train. The Haor Express train is popular among passengers who visit from Mohongonj(Netrokona) to Dhaka via Mymensingh. Some years ago, a special train called 'Demu Train" started at the route Mymensingh to Joydevpur (Gajipur).

Health care and cemeteries
Maharaja Suryakanata set up the first public hospital in Mymensingh along the river Brahmaputra. This is now a leprosy hospital and now called the "S K Hospital." Mymensingh Medical College hospital was established in 1962 and is one of the oldest and biggest hospitals in Bangladesh. Since the end of the 1990s, private investment in the medical sector has gone up and a number of private hospitals of various sizes and clinics have been established. There is another Muslim graveyard at Kalibari named Kalibari Gorosthan. The Hindu Shmoshanghat in Kewatkhali by the side of Brahmaputra railway bridge and the Christian cemetery of the colonial British are also present, and various other smaller cemeteries.

Media and literature

Bharat Mihir was one of the oldest newspapers published from Mymensingh in British India. Its publication commenced in 1875. After independence in 1971, Habibur Rahman Sheikh published in 1979 the first daily under the name and title Dainik Jahan, following his decade-long trial with weekly Banglar Darpan which had been launched in 1972. He also published a women's monthly under the title Chandrakash for almost a decade. The other newspapers published from the city include Dainik Ajker Bangladesh and Dainik Ajker Khabar. Newspapers published from Dhaka came by train and was available around the noon till the 1980s. Hawkers riding bicycle would deliver newspapers from home to home by the afternoon. As the roadlink with Dhaka improved, buses were used for transportation of Dhaka newspapers. Now newspapers from Dhaka arrive Mymensingh by 9.00 in the morning and are delivered to homes by the noon.

Mymensingh Press Club, situated near Ganginarpar is a vibrant hub for the intellectuals, teachers, literature and cultural activists, in addition to media peoples. It hosts literary events, cultural functions and such other activities on a regular basis. Mymensingh Press Club was established towards the end of 1959. It was set up in course of a provincial conference of journalists and editors of the-then East Pakistan, held on 7–8 March 1959. Literary circles of note were Sahitya Sava and Troyodaosh Sammilini.  Earlier, in the 1960s, a leader of the Ahmadya community, Ahmad Toufiq Chowdhury, had set up printing press in his residence at Maharaja Road to bring out a periodic magazine entitled Writupatra. Poets Musharraf Karim and Farid Ahmed Dulal and writer Iffat Ara are some of the important literary names from Mymensingh. In 1985, Ara set up a press in her own residence to bring out the monthly Dwitiyo Chinta.

Notable people 
Bengali scientist Sir Jagadish Chandra Bose was born in Mymensingh on 30 November 1858. The name of Mymensingh is associated with people like anti-British leader Mahadev Sannyal, writer Upendra Kishore Roychowdhury, Sukumar Ray and Leela Majumdar, musician and a disciple of Rabindranath Tagore, Shilpacharya Zainul Abedin, novelist Shirshendu Mukhopadhyay who received early education in Mymensingh town, Humayun Ahmed a Bengali writer, Mahmudul Hasan – Islamic Scholar, P.C. Sorcar – magician, Abul Fateh diplomat, statesman, Sufi, Liberation hero and the first Foreign Secretary of Bangladesh, acting president of Bangladesh during the war of liberation Syed Nazrul Islam in addition to three other presidents of the country, including, Justice Abu Sayeed Chowdhury and Shahabuddin Ahmed. Politician and author Abul Mansur Ahmed, the-then Governor of East Pakistan Abdul Monem Khan, educationist principal Ibrahim Khan, poets Nirmalendu Goon, Helal Hafiz, and Abid Azad, geologist Subhrangsu Kanta Acharyya, writer Jatin Sarker.

Golam Samdani Quraishy, writer, founder GS-BCUTA, Shahid Akhand, Helena Khan, Iffat Ara, are associated with Mymensingh.

The Oscar-winning Indian filmmaker Satyajit Ray and Bollywood actress Rani Mukerji's family hail from Mymensingh. Taslima Nasreen, the feminist writer hails from the district as well.

Gallery

References

Further reading 
 Khan Mohammad Abdullah, Moymonsigh-er Etihash, 1966, Mymensingh.
 Darji Abdul Wahab, Moymonsigh-er Choritavidhan, 1986, Mymensingh.
 F. A. Sachse, Mymensingh Gazetteer, Bengal Secretariat Book Depot, 1917, Calcutta.
 Asoke Mitra, Towards Independence – 1940–1947, 1997, New Delhi.
 Kedarnath Mojumder, Moymonsingh-er Biboron, 1987, Mymensingh.
 Kedarnath Mojumder, Moymonsingh-er Etihash, 1987, Mymensingh.

External links 

 Muktagacha, a historical place of Mymensingh District
 Mymensingh District in Banglapedia
 Mymensingh WEB Portal
 

 
Populated places in Mymensingh District
Pourashavas of Bangladesh